Kinley Wangchuk (born 23 September 1991) is a Bhutanese international footballer, currently playing for Druk Star. He made his first appearance for the Bhutan national football team in 2009.

References

External links

1986 births
Bhutanese footballers
Bhutan international footballers
Yeedzin F.C. players
Living people
Association football defenders